was a railway station in the city of  Kesennuma, Miyagi, Japan, operated by East Japan Railway Company (JR East) until 2011. The station became a stop on the replacement bus rapid transit (BRT) line following the March 2011 Tōhoku earthquake and tsunami.

Lines
Motoyoshi Station was served by the Kesennuma Line, and was located 51.5 rail kilometers from the terminus of the line at Maeyachi Station.

Station layout
The station had a single island platform connected to the station building by a footbridge. The station was unattended.

History

Motoyoshi Station opened on 11 February 1957. The station was absorbed into the JR East network upon the privatization of the Japanese National Railways (JNR) on 1 April 1987. The station itself was only slightly damaged by 2011 Tōhoku earthquake and tsunami, however, rail services on the line were subsequently replaced by a bus rapid transit (BRT) line.

Surrounding area
National Route 45
National Route 45
National Health Insurance Hospital
Kesennuma City East Branch Office

References

External links

 JR East Station information 
  video of a train trip from Rikuzen-Hashikami Station to Motoyoshi Station in 2009
  video of a train trip from Motoyoshi Station to Utatsu Station in 2009

Stations of East Japan Railway Company
Railway stations in Miyagi Prefecture
Kesennuma Line
Railway stations in Japan opened in 1957
Railway stations closed in 2011
Kesennuma